KAPY-LP (95.5 FM, "Traditional Country") was a radio station broadcasting a country music format. Formerly licensed to Port Angeles, Washington, United States, the station was owned by Dry Creek Community Broadcasting. The station's license to cover was cancelled by the FCC on May 6, 2011.

References

External links
 

APY-LP
APY-LP
Port Angeles, Washington
Defunct radio stations in the United States
Radio stations disestablished in 2011
2011 disestablishments in Washington (state)
APY-LP